HNLMS Piet Hein was an   of the Royal Netherlands Navy, named after 17th century Dutch Admiral Piet Pieterszoon Hein.

Design
In the mid-1920s, the Netherlands placed orders for four new destroyers to be deployed to the East Indies. They were built in Dutch shipyards to a design by the British Yarrow Shipbuilders, which was based on the destroyer , which Yarrow had designed and built for the British Royal Navy.

The ship's main gun armament was four  guns built by the Swedish company Bofors, mounted two forward and two aft, with two  anti-aircraft guns mounted amidships. Four 12.7 mm machine guns provided close-in anti-aircraft defence. The ship's torpedo armament comprised six  torpedo tubes in two triple mounts, while 24 mines could also be carried. To aid search operations, the ship carried a Fokker C.VII-W floatplane on a platform over the aft torpedo tubes, which was lowered to the sea by a crane for flight operations.

Service history

The ship was laid down on 26 August 1925, at the shipyard of Burgerhout's Scheepswerf en Machinefabriek in Rotterdam, and launched on 2 April 1927. The ship was commissioned on 25 January 1929.

Later that year on 13 November, both s and the destroyers , Witte de With, and Piet Hein made a fleet visit to Singapore. Before the visit they had practised in the South China Sea.

On 13 October 1938, she collided with Java in the Sunda Strait. Java had to be repaired at Surabaya.

World War II
She served mostly in the Netherlands East Indies, and when war broke out in 1941, she was at Surabaya.

References

Bibliography
 
 Gardiner, Robert and Roger Chesneau. Conway's All The World's Fighting Ships 1922–1946. London: Conway Maritime Press 1980. . 
 Whitley, M.J. Destroyers of World War Two: An International Encyclopedia. London: Cassell & Co, 2000. .

 

Admiralen-class destroyers
Ships built in Rotterdam
1927 ships
World War II destroyers of the Netherlands
World War II shipwrecks in the Java Sea
Articles containing video clips
Maritime incidents in February 1942